Fleming Township is the name of some places in the U.S. state of Minnesota:
Fleming Township, Aitkin County, Minnesota
Fleming Township, Pine County, Minnesota

Minnesota township disambiguation pages